Shafiq Arain was a Ugandan politician who was the Minister of East African Community Affairs and Chairman for the Minimum Wages Commission. In 1967, he served as Uganda’s Delegate to the UN General Assembly. Later, in 1980, he was appointed Uganda's High Commissioner to London.

Early life and career
Arain was born in 1933 in Nsambya Landis, Kampala to an East African Railways middle-level cadre employee in Uganda. He went to England for higher studies.

In May 1962, Arain became a member of the Parliament of Uganda.

In 1970, following the coup, he left for exile in London. Following the defeat of Idi Amin’s dictatorial regime, Shafiq became the Ugandan High Commissioner to the United Kingdom.

He died on 20 March 2005 in Spain.

References

1933 births
2005 deaths
Ugandan people of Pakistani descent
Government ministers of Uganda